José Gregorio Castillo Tovar (born January 10, 1996) is a Venezuelan professional baseball pitcher for the San Diego Padres of Major League Baseball (MLB).

Career

Tampa Bay Rays
Castillo signed with the Tampa Bay Rays as a non-drafted free agent on July 7, 2012. He spent under two seasons playing for Tampa Bay's minor league affiliates.

San Diego Padres
The Rays traded Castillo, Wil Myers, Ryan Hanigan and Gerardo Reyes to the San Diego Padres in exchange for René Rivera, Burch Smith and Jake Bauers on December 19, 2014.

Castillo was selected as a member of the Venezuela national baseball team at the 2017 World Baseball Classic.

After the 2017 season, the Padres added Castillo to their 40-man roster to protect him from the Rule 5 draft. Castillo was called up and made his major league debut on June 2, 2018, and pitched a 1-2-3 inning with 3 strikeouts that night, including strikeouts of Cincinnati Reds all-star sluggers Joey Votto and Eugenio Suarez.  He ended the season 3–3 with an ERA of 3.29 in 37 games. In  innings, he struck out 52 batters.

Castillo began the 2019 season on the 60-day injured list due to a left flexor strain. He only pitched in 2/3 of an inning for the Padres in 2019, allowing no runs and striking out two, before suffering an injury to his left middle finger and ending the season on the 60-day injured list. Due to the 2020 Major League Baseball season being shortened to 60 games because of the COVID-19 pandemic, Castillo ended up missing the entire season due to a left lat strain and a torn ligament in his hand. On March 4, 2021, it was announced that Castillo would require Tommy John surgery after exiting a simulated game on March 2 because of forearm tightness. On March 6, Castillo was placed on the 60-day injured list.

On November 30, 2021, Castillo was non-tendered by the Padres, making him a free agent.  On January 14, 2022, Castillo re-signed with the Padres. He had his contract selected on August 23, 2022. On November 18, Castillo signed a one-year contract with the Padres, avoiding arbitration.

References

External links

1996 births
Living people
Arizona League Padres players
El Paso Chihuahuas players
Fort Wayne TinCaps players
Gulf Coast Rays players
Lake Elsinore Storm players
Major League Baseball pitchers
Major League Baseball players from Venezuela
Navegantes del Magallanes players
San Antonio Missions players
San Diego Padres players
Sportspeople from Valencia, Venezuela
Tri-City Dust Devils players
Venezuelan expatriate baseball players in the United States
World Baseball Classic players of Venezuela
2017 World Baseball Classic players